Michael D. Shonrock (born August 6, 1957 in Chicago, Illinois) is an American academic and former administrator. He was the president of Lindenwood University, located in St. Charles, Missouri, June 2015 to February 2019. Shonrock previously served as Emporia State University's 16th president from January 3, 2012 to May 28, 2015, and before that as Texas Tech University's vice president for student affairs and enrollment management in Lubbock, Texas.

Education
Shonrock received his bachelor of science in 1979 from Western Illinois University, and attended Pittsburg State University for his master's of science in 1981 and Ed.S. in 1987, and graduated from University of Kansas in 1991 with his doctorate.

Career

Texas Tech University
After graduating from KU, Shonrock began his career in education in 1991, as an assistant professor in the Texas Tech University College of Education. Shonrock was mostly known in the 2008 planning of Texas Tech's $3-million on-campus chapel and announced that "no religious affiliations will be included and there will be stained-glass windows without religious images, and movable chairs, rather than pews." Shonrock was involved in the leadership of the Lubbock Area United Way, the Lubbock Chamber of Commerce, and the University Medical Center. He attended the United Methodist Church.

He has held leadership positions in the National Association of State Universities and Land-Grant Colleges; in 2000 he received the Texas Tech University President's Quality Service Award.

Emporia State University presidency
Shonrock was named Emporia State's 16th president in December 2011, in which he would begin January 2, 2012. During Shonrock’s administration at Emporia State, the university launched a $45 million fundraising campaign, the largest in Emporia State's history, increased enrollment growth, and received additional funding from the Government of Kansas for an honors college. Shonrock also led the development of a new ten-year campus master plan, a new university strategic plan, a new marketing campaign, better communication with alumni, and created new partnerships with the community. Shonrock also started a bi-weekly radio segment called ESU Buzz with President Michael Shonrock on KVOE, which always had special guest and discussed current events happening at Emporia State University. Shonrock's last day at Emporia State was May 28 as he left to become the President of Lindenwood University.

References

1957 births
Living people
Educational psychologists
Pittsburg State University alumni
University of Kansas alumni
Western Illinois University alumni
Texas Tech University faculty
Presidents of Emporia State University
Emporia State University faculty
Presidents of Lindenwood University
20th-century Methodists
21st-century Methodists
American United Methodists